Nicator is a genus of songbird endemic to Africa. It can also refer to:

 the Hellenistic title Nicator or Nikator (Νικάτωρ, meaning "Victor"), borne by:
 Seleucus I Nicator, general of Alexander the Great and founder of the Seleucid empire
 Demetrius II Nicator, king of the Seleucid empire
 Amyntas Nikator, Indo-Greek king
 Antiochus Nikator, Greco-Bactrian king
 HMS Nictator (1916), M-class destroyer during World War I
 HMS Nicator (J457), cancelled Algerine-class minesweeper during World War II